Ngiwal a village in Babeldaob island, the largest island in the island nation of the Republic of Palau. The village is the administrative center of Ngiwal state of Palau.

References

Populated places in Palau